"Treat Her Like a Lady" is a song by American R&B singer Joe. It was written by Steve "Stone" Huff and Isaac Hayes and produced by Huff for Joe's third studio album My Name is Joe (2000). Released as the album's second single in May 2000, it reached number 63 on the US Billboard Hot 100 and number 15 on the Billboard Hot R&B/Hip-Hop Songs chart, becoming the album's lowest-charting single.

Track listings
Promo Version 
"Treat Her Like A Lady" - 4:17

European 12" Promo Version
"Treat Her Like A Lady" - 4:17
"I'm Missing You" - 4:25
"Soon As I Get Paid" - 3:13

CD Single Version
"Treat Her Like A Lady" - 4:17
"I'm Missing You" - 4:25

Maxi Single Version 
"Treat Her Like A Lady" - 4:17
"I'm Missing You" - 4:25
"Soon As I Get Paid" - 3:13
"No One Else Comes Close" - 3:50

Credits and personnel
Credits for "Treat Her Like a Lady" major single releases.

 Andy Blakelock – engineer
 Joel Campbell – producer
 Tom Coyne - mastering engineer
 Stephen George – mixing
 Allen Gordon Jr. – producer
 Jean-Marie Horvat – mixing
 Steve "Stone" Huff – producer

 Joe - featured artist, primary artist, vocals
 Tim Kelley - producer
 Andrew Lyn – mixing assistant
 Angelo Qauglia – engineer
 Bob Robinson – producer
 Brian Smith – mixing, engineer
 Jeff Vereb – engineer

Charts

Weekly charts

Year-end charts

Release history

References

2000 songs
2000 singles
Jive Records singles
Joe (singer) songs
Songs written by Isaac Hayes